The Great Synagogue of Jerusalem,, is located at 56 King George Street, Jerusalem. Rabbi Zalman Druck was the spiritual leader from the synagogue's establishment until his death on 11 December 2009.

History
As early as 1923 the Chief Rabbis of Israel, Abraham Kook and Jacob Meir, mooted plans for a large central synagogue in Jerusalem. It was over 30 years later in 1958 when Heichal Shlomo, seat of the Israeli Rabbinate, was founded, that a small synagogue was established within the building. As time passed and the need for more space grew, services were moved and held in the foyer of Heichal Shlomo. Soon afterwards, when the premises could not hold the number of worshippers attending, it was decided that a new, much larger synagogue be built.

The plot of land next to Heichal Shlomo was purchased with the efforts of Dr Moshe Avrohom Yaffe, chairman of the Board of Management of Heichal Shlomo. The main sponsor for construction of the new synagogue was Sir Isaac Wolfson, a Jewish philanthropist from Britain. The Wolfson family consecrated the synagogue in the memory of the six million Jews who were murdered in the Holocaust and to the fallen soldiers of Israel Defense Forces.

The style of the building was modeled on the Jewish Temple by German-born architect .

The inauguration took place on Tu B'Av 1982. Naftali Hershtik was appointed the chief cantor of the synagogue, a position he held until succeeded by Chief Cantor Chaim Adler on 31 December 2008. In addition, Cantors Avraham Kirshenbaum and Tzvi Weiss often lead the prayers, either alone or together with Chief Cantor Adler.

The sanctuary seats 850 men and 550 women. A comprehensive private collection of mezuzah cases is on show inside the lobby.

Image gallery

See also
Great Synagogue
 Wolfson family

References

External links
Jerusalem Great Synagogue Official Website

Synagogues in Jerusalem
Orthodox synagogues in Israel
Buildings and structures in Jerusalem
1982 establishments in Israel
Rehavia
Synagogues completed in 1982